Phelan Hill  (born 21 July 1979) is a British rowing coxswain. He is a three-time world champion and an Olympic gold medallist. He competed in the Men's eight event at the 2012 Summer Olympics, winning a bronze medal. In 2016, he competed in the Men's eight event at the 2016 Summer Olympics, winning the gold medal.

Early life
Hill was born and brought up in Bedford, and attended Bedford School, where he first learnt to row. He later attended the University of Leicester where he graduated in 2001 with a degree in Law (LLB).

Rowing

2011
He was part of the British squad that topped the medal table at the 2011 World Rowing Championships in Bled, where he won a silver medal as part of the eight with Nathaniel Reilly-O'Donnell, Cameron Nichol, James Foad, Alex Partridge, Moe Sbihi, Greg Searle, Tom Ransley and Daniel Ritchie.

2013
He competed at the 2013 World Rowing Championships in Chungju, where he won a gold medal as part of the eight with Daniel Ritchie, Tom Ransley, Alex Gregory, Pete Reed, Moe Sbihi, Andrew Triggs Hodge, George Nash and Will Satch.

2014
On 17 March 2014 Hill coxed the composite crew that won the Women's Eights Head of the River Race on the River Thames in London, setting a record time of 17:42.2 for the 4 1⁄4-mile (6.8 km) Championship Course from Mortlake to Putney. He competed at the 2014 World Rowing Championships in Bosbaan, Amsterdam, where he won a gold medal as part of the eight with Nathaniel Reilly-O'Donnell, Matthew Tarrant, Will Satch, Matt Gotrel, Pete Reed, Paul Bennett, Tom Ransley and Constantine Louloudis.

2015
On 14 March 2015 Hill coxed the composite crew that won the Women's Eights Head of the River Race on the River Thames in London, setting a time of 18:58.6 for the 4 1⁄4-mile (6.8 km) Championship Course from Mortlake to Putney. He was part of the British team that topped the medal table at the 2015 World Rowing Championships at Lac d'Aiguebelette in France, where he won a gold medal as part of the eight with Matt Gotrel, Constantine Louloudis, Pete Reed, Paul Bennett, Moe Sbihi, Alex Gregory, George Nash and Will Satch.

Rowing medals

Olympic Games
2012 London – Bronze, Men's Eight
2016 Rio – Gold, Men's Eight

World Championships
2010 Karapiro – Silver, Men's Eight
2011 Bled – Silver, Men's Eight
2013 Chungju – Gold, Men's Eight
2014 Amsterdam – Gold, Men's Eight
2015 Aiguebelette – Gold, Men's Eight

World Cups
2007 Amsterdam – Gold, Eight
2009 Banyoles – Bronze, Eight
2009 Munich – Bronze, Eight
2010 Bled – Gold, Eight
2010 Munich – Bronze, Eight
2010 Lucerne – Bronze, Eight
2011 Munich – Silver, Eight
2011 Lucerne – Bronze, Eight
2012 Belgrade – Silver, Eight
2012 Lucerne – Silver, Eight
2012 Munich – Bronze, Eight

References

1979 births
Living people
English male rowers
British male rowers
Olympic rowers of Great Britain
Rowers at the 2012 Summer Olympics
Rowers at the 2016 Summer Olympics
Sportspeople from Bedford
Olympic bronze medallists for Great Britain
Olympic medalists in rowing
People educated at Bedford School
Medalists at the 2012 Summer Olympics
Coxswains (rowing)
Members of Leander Club
Alumni of the University of Leicester
World Rowing Championships medalists for Great Britain
Olympic gold medallists for Great Britain
Medalists at the 2016 Summer Olympics
Members of the Order of the British Empire
European Rowing Championships medalists